Richard Grenville (by 1524 – 1577 or 1578), of Stowe, Kilkhampton and Penheale, Cornwall, was a politician and Member (MP) of the Parliament of England for the constituency of Newport, Cornwall in 1545 and 1559, and for Dunheved in 1555 and 1563.

References

1578 deaths
People from Kilkhampton
English MPs 1545–1547
English MPs 1555
English MPs 1559
English MPs 1563–1567
Members of the pre-1707 English Parliament for constituencies in Cornwall
Year of birth uncertain